Palayesh Naft Abadan Basketball Club is an Iranian professional basketball club based in Abadan, Iran. They compete in the Iranian Basketball Super League.

Sanat Naft made the final of the Iranian Super League in 2016, but were swept 4–0 by rivals Petrochimi.

Sana Naft wins his first title of the Iranian Super League in 2019, after beating 3-1 Shahrdari Gorgan BC.

Roster

Male Team

Female Team

References

Basketball teams established in 2014
Basketball teams in Iran